Grubb Glacier is a glacier flowing into Lester Cove, Andvord Bay, to the west of Bagshawe Glacier, on the west coast of Graham Land, Antarctica. The glacier appears on an Argentine government chart of 1952. It was named by the UK Antarctic Place-Names Committee in 1960 for Thomas Grubb, an Irish optician who designed and introduced the first aplanatic camera lens, in 1857.

References

Glaciers of Danco Coast